Gavin Morrison (born 3 January 1990) is a Scottish professional footballer who plays as a midfielder for Spartans. 

Morrison has formerly played for Inverness, Elgin City, Brora Rangers and Cowdenbeath.

Career
Morrison made his senior debut for Inverness Caledonian Thistle in the First Division on 22 August 2009. In April 2012, he signed a four-month loan deal with Icelandic side Grindavík. In January 2013, Morrison re-signed for Elgin City on loan for the second time, following an earlier spell in 2010.

He was released by Inverness Caledonian Thistle at the end of the 2012–13 season and signed for Brora Rangers in July, making his début in a friendly against Ross County.

In January 2020 he moved to Cowdenbeath, moving to Spartans in June 2022.

Career statistics

References

1990 births
Living people
Scottish footballers
Inverness Caledonian Thistle F.C. players
Elgin City F.C. players
Brora Rangers F.C. players
Scottish Football League players
Scottish Premier League players
Association football midfielders
Footballers from Inverness
Expatriate footballers in Iceland
Scottish expatriate footballers
Grindavík men's football players
Scottish expatriate sportspeople in Iceland
Cowdenbeath F.C. players
Spartans F.C. players
Highland Football League players
Scottish Professional Football League players